Desulfohalobiaceae is a family of bacteria belonging to the phylum Thermodesulfobacteriota.

See also
 List of bacterial orders
 List of bacteria genera

References

Desulfovibrionales
Bacteria families